The 1928 Vermont gubernatorial election took place on November 6, 1928. Incumbent Republican John E. Weeks ran successfully for re-election to a second term as Governor of Vermont, defeating Democratic candidate Harry C. Shurtleff. Weeks, who sought an exception to the Vermont Republican Party's "Mountain Rule", was the first Vermont Governor elected to a second two-year term.

Republican primary

Results

Democratic primary

Results

General election

Candidates
John E. Weeks, incumbent Governor of Vermont
Frank M. Post, resident of Burlington
Harry C. Shurtleff, lawyer and former Mayor of Montpelier

Results

References

Vermont
1928
Gubernatorial
November 1928 events in the United States